The Yabus River (or Khor Yabus) rises in the far west of Ethiopia, in Asosa Zone, flows west into Sudan past the town of Yabus, then enters South Sudan.  At the town of Bunj it turns south west and enters the Machar Marshes, where it loses its identity.

The river is sometimes confused with the Dabus River, a tributary of the Blue Nile, also known as the Yabus River.  The sources of the two rivers are close to each other.

See also 
 List of rivers of South Sudan
 List of rivers of Sudan
 List of rivers of Ethiopia

References

Rivers of Ethiopia
Rivers of Sudan
Rivers of South Sudan
International rivers of Africa